Pseudodon is a genus of bivalvia of the Unionidae family that is native to East and Southeast Asia. There are 14 recognized species.

Description 

The taxon was described by John Gould from his findings at the Salween River Basin in British Burma as a subgenus of the genus Anodon. Gould included two species in the taxon, the type species Anodon inoscularis and Anodon salweniana.

The shell of Pseudodon is rather thick and shaped like an elongated oval, with a slightly convex crown on the upper valve shifted toward the rear. The surface, although most often smooth, is in some species crossed by deep transverse furrows. The hinge teeth are high, thick, and rounded at the apices.

Range 

The habitat of the genus is limited to East and Southeast Asia, mainly the Yangtze River Basin and Myanmar. The species Pseudodon inoscularis is also found in Thailand, Cambodia, and southern Vietnam, while the species Pseudodon resupinatus is endemic to northern Vietnam, and the species Pseudodon vondembuschianus is found in Indonesia and Indochina.

Hominid use 

Pseudodon shell DUB1006-fL is a fossil shell of Pseudodon vondembuschianus trinilensis that was found in Trinil, Java, Indonesia. The shell has a zigzag pattern engraved on it by a Homo erectus. It was carved between 540,000 and 430,000 years before present, and is the oldest known anthropogenic carving in the world. There is an ongoing controversy on whether or not the carving can qualify as art (which would make it the oldest piece of art in the world). Some commentators call it a "doodle" or "decorative marks", while others suggest that the carving is explicitly art.

Currently recognized species 

 Pseudodon aureus
 Pseudodon avae
 Pseudodon bogani
 Pseudodon crebristriatus
 Pseudodon inoscularis
 Pseudodon kayinensis
 Pseudodon manueli
 Pseudodon nankingensis
 Pseudodon peguensis
 Pseudodon pinchonianus
 Pseudodon resupinatus
 Pseudodon salwenianus
 Pseudodon secundus
 Pseudodon vondembuschianus

References 

Unionidae
Bivalve genera